Marcelo Ríos won in the final 6–4, 2–6, 7–6(7–1), 5–7, 6–3 against Andre Agassi. It was Ríos' 6th title of the year and the 11th of his career.

Seeds
Champion seeds are indicated in bold text while text in italics indicates the round in which those seeds were eliminated.

 Petr Korda (quarterfinals)
 Marcelo Ríos (champion)
 Mark Philippoussis (semifinals)
 Goran Ivanišević (quarterfinals)

Draw

Finals

References

External links
 Official results archive (ATP)
 Official results archive (ITF)

Men's Singles
Singles